Ribes aureum, known by the common names golden currant, clove currant, pruterberry and buffalo currant, is a species of flowering plant in the genus Ribes native to North America.

Description 
The leaves are green, semi-leathery, with 3 or 5 lobes, and turn red in autumn.

The plant blooms in spring with racemes of conspicuous golden yellow flowers, often with a pronounced, spicy fragrance similar to that of cloves or vanilla. Flowers may also be shades of cream to reddish, and are borne in clusters of up to 15. The ripe fruits are amber yellow to black. Those of variety villosum are black.

Taxonomy 
The species belongs to the subgenus Ribes, which contains other currants such as the blackcurrant (R. nigrum) and redcurrant (R. rubrum), and is the sole member of the section Symphocalyx.

Varieties 
 Ribes aureum var. aureum: below  in the western U.S.
 Ribes aureum var. gracillimum: below  in the California Coast Ranges
 Ribes aureum var. villosum – clove currant (syn: Ribes odoratum); native west of Mississippi River, but naturalized further to the east

Distribution and habitat 
Ribes aureum is native to Canada and the central United States West of the Mississippi River, but has escaped cultivation and naturalized in the Eastern United States.

It can be found around gravel banks and plains around flowing water.

Ecology

Pollinators of the plant include hummingbirds, butterflies and bees. The fruit is eaten by various birds and mammals.

This currant species is susceptible to white pine blister rust (Cronartium ribicola), a fungus which attacks and kills pines, so it is sometimes eradicated from forested areas where the fungus is active to prevent its spread.

Cultivation
R. aureum is widely cultivated as an ornamental plant, in traditional, native plant, drought tolerant, and wildlife gardens, and natural landscaping projects. Unlike some other species of currants, Ribes aureum is in the remarkably drought-tolerant group of Ribes. Named cultivars have been introduced also.

Although the flowers are hermaphroditic, the yield is greatly benefited by cross-pollination.

Uses
The fruits are edible raw, but are very tart or bitter. They are usually cooked with sugar and can be made into jelly. The flowers are also edible.

The berries were used for food, and other plant parts for medicine, by various Native American groups across its range in North America.

References

External links

 Jepson Manual Treatment – Ribes aureum
 United States Department of Agriculture Plants Profile: Ribes aureum (golden currant)
 University of Washington, Burke Museum
 
 Line drawing for Flora of Pakistan

aureum
Flora of Canada
Flora of the United States
Natural history of the California chaparral and woodlands
Natural history of the California Coast Ranges
Natural history of the Transverse Ranges
Plants used in Native American cuisine
Plants used in traditional Native American medicine
Garden plants of North America
Drought-tolerant plants
Plants described in 1813